The 2014 World Under-17 Hockey Challenge was an ice hockey tournament held in Sarnia and Lambton Shores, Ontario, Canada, from November 2 to 8, 2014.

Luke Kirwan scored twice, Colin White added a goal and an assist to finish as tournament scoring leader, and Michael Lackey needed to make just 12 saves as the U.S. blanked Pacific to win its fourth under-17 gold medal.

https://www.hockeycanada.ca/en-ca/national-championships/men/world-u17/2014

Final standings

External links
Official website
 https://www.hockeycanada.ca/en-ca/national-championships/men/world-u17/2014

World U-17 Hockey Challenge 2011
Sport in Sarnia
World U-17 Hockey Challenge
International ice hockey competitions hosted by Canada
U-17
World U-17 Hockey Challenge 2011
World U-17 Hockey Challenge 2011